The Sigma 150mm 2.8 APO Macro EX DG HSM is a telephoto macro prime lenses made by the Sigma Corporation.

The lens is produced for the SA mount, Canon EF mount, Four Thirds System, and the  Nikon F-mount varieties; all have the same optical formula.

When used on a digital crop body with a field of view compensation factor of 1.6x, such as the Canon EOS 450D, it provides a narrower field of view, equivalent to a 240mm lens mounted on a 35mm frame body. With a 1.5x body such as the Nikon D300 It provides a less narrow field of view, equivalent to a 225mm lens mounted on a 35mm frame body. With a 1.3x body such as the Canon EOS-1D Mark III It provides an even less narrow field of view, equivalent to a 195mm lens mounted on a 35mm frame body.

Technical information
The Sigma 150mm 2.8 APO Macro EX DG HSM is a consumer-level macro lens. It is constructed with a plastic body and a metal mount. This lens features a distance window with magnification scale. A nine-blade, maximum aperture of 2.8 gives this lens the ability to create very shallow depth of field effects. The optical construction of this lens contains 16 lens elements, including two SLD (Special Low Dispersion) elements. This lens uses an inner focusing system, powered by a ring type HSM motor.  Auto focus speed of this lens is slow in absolute terms, being a macro lens it is not as fast as most ring HSM lenses. However, it remains very decent for a macro lens. The front of the lens does not rotate nor extend when focusing. This lens is compatible with Sigma teleconverter lenses.

Gallery

See also
List of Nikon compatible lenses with integrated autofocus-motor

References

150
Macro lenses
Camera lenses introduced in 2006